The 2002–03 Primeira Liga was the 69th edition of top flight of Portuguese football. It started on 25 August 2002 with a match between Varzim and Paços de Ferreira, and ended on 1 June 2003. The league was contested by 18 clubs with Sporting CP as the defending champions.

Porto won the league and qualified for the 2003–04 UEFA Champions League group stage, along with Benfica, who qualified for the third round. Sporting and União de Leiria qualified for the 2003–04 UEFA Cup. In opposite, Varzim, Santa Clara and Vitória de Setúbal were relegated to the Segunda Liga. Faye Fary was the top scorer with 18 goals.

Promotion and relegation

Teams relegated to Segunda Liga
Salgueiros
Farense
Alverca

Salgueiros, Farense and Alverca, were consigned to the Segunda Liga following their final classification in 2001–02 season.

Teams promoted from Segunda Liga
Moreirense
Académica de Coimbra
Nacional

The other three teams were replaced by Moreirense, Académica and Nacional from the Segunda Liga.

Teams

Stadia and locations

Managerial changes

League table

Results

Top goalscorers

Source: Footballzz

Footnotes

External links
 Portugal 2002-03 - RSSSF (Jorge Miguel Teixeira)
 Portuguese League 2002/03 - footballzz.co.uk
 Portugal - Table of Honor - Soccer Library 

Primeira Liga seasons
Port
1